Erotokritos Damarlis (born on 13 May 1992) is Greek midfielder currently playing in the Football League for Agrotikos Asteras.

Club career

Aris
He started his career in youth teams of Aris Thessaloniki. In 2012, new head coach Makis Katsavakis promoted him to the first team, and he made his professional debut on 26 August 2012, in a Supeleague game against Panionios.

Career statistics

References

External links
 
Myplayer.gr Profile

1992 births
Living people
Aris Thessaloniki F.C. players
Super League Greece players
Greek footballers
Association football midfielders
Footballers from Thessaloniki